The Legacy at Millennium Park is a 72-story skyscraper in Chicago, Illinois, United States, located along S. Wabash Avenue, near E. Monroe Street. At , it is the seventeenth-tallest building in Chicago.

The residential tower and mixed-use podium, designed by the architectural firm Solomon, Cordwell, Buenz, contains 360 luxury condominium units and 460 parking spaces. Additionally the building includes  of classroom space for the School of the Art Institute of Chicago in the lower floors, athletic facilities for the University Club, a sky-bridge between the University Club and the building podium, and private amenities for tower residents including an athletics and aquatic center as well as residential lounges located throughout the tower. The building preserves the historic masonry and terracotta facades of the Chicago Landmark Jewelers Row District along Wabash Avenue.

The building's narrow design is intended to maximize vantage points to Lake Michigan and Millennium Park from all residences in the tower.

See also
Facadism
The Heritage at Millennium Park
List of tallest buildings in Chicago
List of tallest buildings in the United States
List of tallest buildings in the world
List of tallest residential buildings in the world

References

External links

Solomon Cordwell Buenz Website Page For The Legacy
Developer Website for The Legacy
Lynn Beckerwrites about the Legacy Tower Facadectomy, 2006
Google Earth Model

Residential skyscrapers in Chicago
Residential condominiums in Chicago
University and college academic buildings in the United States
Residential buildings completed in 2009
2009 establishments in Illinois